Pietro Ridolfi (active 1710–1716) was an Italian engraver of the late Baroque period.

He is known for a frontispiece which he engraved from a design by C. N. Lampare, affixed to a volume containing views of ancient and modern Rome, published at Venice in 1716. It is executed in a style resembling that of Cornelis Bloemaert.

References

Italian engravers
Artists from Venice
1710 births
1716 deaths